The Seamen's Act, formally known as Act to Promote the Welfare of American Seamen in the Merchant Marine of the United States or Longshore and Harbor Workers' Compensation Act (Act of March 4, 1915, ch. 153, 38 Stat. 1164), was designed to improve the safety and security of United States seamen and eliminate shanghaiing.

"The 1915 statute ... has been described as the Magna Carta of American sailors' rights."

History

Trade unions like the International Seamen's Union (ISU) provided much of the impetus for the bill, further promoted by the increasing international tensions in the years preceding World War I. The bill was first proposed in 1913 but it became a law after the beginning of hostilities in Europe, though before the United States joined the conflict. The sinking of the RMS Titanic in 1912 raised the issue of safety at sea as a political issue as well.

The Act was sponsored in the United States Senate by Robert Marion La Follette. The ISU had a significant influence on the drafting of the Bill, with the President of the Union, Andrew Furuseth, cited as being behind the intent and content of the bill. Secretary of Labor William B. Wilson supported its passage.

It was the culmination of twenty years of agitation by the Seamen's Union President Andrew Furuseth. President Woodrow Wilson had supported such a bill at the beginning of his Administration, but in late 1913, United States Secretary of State William Jennings Bryan had been negotiating with the British for a Convention on Safety at Sea Treaty which would have established international, rather than national, standards for the treatment of sailors on ships. The Senate ratified the Bryan Conciliation Treaty on August 27, 1914, and the Secretary urged Wilson to pocket-veto the La Follette Bill.  One look at Andrew Furuseth in person, however, an almost pitiful looking elderly man dressed haggardly and resembling an old "Popeye the Sailor", convinced both of them to change their mind.  Furuseth came to Washington to literally beg Wilson to sign the bill.  Bryan was nearly moved to tears, realizing the sincere determination and conviction of a man who had labored for such legislation for decades, and the President signed it into law. Explaining his signing of the bill, Wilson said that he did so "because it seemed the only chance to get something like justice done to a class of workmen who have been too much neglected by our laws."

The Act was designed to promote the living and working conditions of seamen serving in the United States Merchant Marine. It applied to vessels in excess of 100 gross tons, excluding river craft.

Provisions of the act
The Act included provisions, inter alia (among other things), to:
abolish imprisonment for desertion
reduce penalties for disobedience
regulate the working hours of seamen both at sea and in port
establish a minimum quality for rations supplied to seamen
regulate the payment of wages to seamen 
establish a harsh penalty of double wages per day that any wages remained unpaid upon a sailor's discharge (which resulted in one case in 1982 where the U.S. Supreme Court awarded $302,790.40 to a sailor who had been discharged with $412.50 in unpaid wages)
set safety requirements, including the provision of lifeboats
require a minimum percentage of the seamen aboard a vessel to be qualified able seamen
require at least 75% of the seamen aboard a vessel to understand the language spoken by the officers

Later legislation
The Act did little to help seamen who were injured in the course of their duties, and the Merchant Marine Act of 1920, commonly known as the Jones Act, was passed in an attempt to address such incidents.

Criticism
Shipowners generally opposed the Seamen's Act and the Jones Act as excessive and unnecessary interference with the freedom of contract.  They responded by pioneering the now-common practice of chartering ships overseas under a flag of convenience.  Shipping companies claimed the unhappy result was the crippling of America's merchant marine, as freight rates spiraled upward with crew's wages.

At least one company, the Pacific Mail Steamship Company, ceased operations in the Far East, declaring the increased cost of English speaking crews would make them noncompetitive with foreign companies without such restrictions.

Notes

References

Further reading
 Auerbach, Jerold S. "Progressives at sea: The La Follette act of 1915." Labor History 2.3 (1961): 344-360.
 Donn, Clifford B. "Bargaining in a Global Environment: The United States Ocean-going Maritime Industry." International Journal of Employment Studies 9.2 (2001): 27-43. on recent years
 Fink, Leon. Sweatshops at Sea: Merchant Seamen in the World's First Globalized Industry, from 1812 to the Present (UNC Press Books, 2011).
 Morrison, Stanley Donald. "The Foreign Seaman and the Jones Act." Miami Law Quarterly 8 (1953): 16+ online; it amended the 1915 act.

External links
 – Article by an Able Seaman describing the Seamen's Act and conditions for seafarers

1915 in American law
United States federal admiralty and maritime legislation